Cornman: American Vegetable Hero a.k.a. Cornman II: The Day of the Locusts is an American cult movie first released in March 2001 by WorldWide International Picture Studios, known for producing low budget B-movies with campy concepts.  The film premiered at the South by Southwest Film Festival on March 10, 2001.  The film was directed by Barak Epstein and starred Mike Wiebe and James Hoke.  The film is an homage/parody of superhero films.

Plot
Cornman is a superhero whose powers include the ability to communicate with corn. He must face the evil Dr. Hoe who is trying to take control of all the corn in the world.

Cast

Awards
The film won several awards at the various film festivals where it was screened.  It premiered at the 2001 South by Southwest Film Festival but failed to garner any awards there.  The film won the 2001 Deep Ellum Award for Best Comedy Feature at the Deep Ellum Film Festival.

References

External links 
 
 Official site
 WIP Studios
 
 

2001 films
2001 comedy films
American superhero films
American independent films
2000s superhero comedy films
2001 independent films
2000s English-language films
2000s American films